Bie Ge (born 2 August 1992) is a Chinese sprinter. He won a gold medal in the 4 × 100 m relay at the 2017 Asian Championships, and finished fourth in the 200 m. He placed eighth in this event at the 2018 Asian Games.

References

Chinese male sprinters
1992 births
Living people
Athletes (track and field) at the 2018 Asian Games
Asian Games competitors for China